Charles J. Peterson (7 December 1933 - 12 June 2009) was an American philatelist who signed the Roll of Distinguished Philatelists in 1991.

References

American philatelists
Signatories to the Roll of Distinguished Philatelists
1933 births
2009 deaths